is a song by Japanese singer-songwriter Rina Aiuchi. It was released on 25 October 2000 through Giza Studio, as the fourth single from her debut album Be Happy. The song served as the theme song to the Japanese animated television series Case Closed.

Commercial performance
"Koi wa Thrill, Shock, Suspense" peaked at number five on the Oricon Weekly Singles Chart, becoming Aiuchi's first top ten single. The single has sold 105,260 copies and remains as the singer's second best-selling single, behind "Navy Blue" (2001).

Track listing

Charts

Certification and sales

|-
! scope="row"| Japan (RIAJ)
| Gold
| 105,260
|-
|}

Release history

References

2000 singles
2000 songs
J-pop songs
Songs written by Aika Ohno
Anime songs
Giza Studio singles
Song recordings produced by Daiko Nagato
Songs written by Rina Aiuchi